The 2004 Sheraton Hawaii Bowl, part of the 2004 bowl game season, took place on Christmas Eve 2004, at Aloha Stadium in Honolulu, Hawaii. The competing teams were the UAB Blazers, representing Conference USA (C-USA) and the Hawaii Warriors, representing the Western Athletic Conference (WAC). Hawaii won the game, 59–40. This was the third Hawaii Bowl, and was sponsored by Sheraton Hotels and Resorts.

Teams

Hawaii

Hawaii finished the 2004 season with an 8–5 record, going 4–4 in WAC play. The Warriors made their third straight appearance in the Hawaii Bowl, facing off against UAB. The Warriors would go on to defeat the Blazers and cap off their third straight winning season, the fifth in six seasons under head coach June Jones.

UAB

The Blazers finished the 2004 season with a record of 7–5 (5–3 C-USA). The Blazers would also make their first and so far only appearance.

Game summary
 
The 2004 Hawaii Bowl kicked off at 2:06 p.m. HST (8:06 p.m. EST) on December 24, 2004 in Honolulu, Hawaii. The contest concluded at 6:12 p.m. HST, lasting a total of four hours and six minutes. Official attendance for the game was listed as 39,754, placing it at fifteenth highest in at dance for non-BCS bowls during the season. It also set an attendance record for the Hawaii Bowl and currently stands as the third-highest attended game. At kickoff, the weather was cloudy with a temperature of approximately 75 degrees. The wind was from the northeast at 6 miles per hour (10 km/h). There was a possibility of rain throughout the game, although only a minimal amount of rainfall was recorded.

First quarter
UAB won the ceremonial pre-game coin toss to select first possession and deferred its option to the second half; Hawaii elected to receive the opening kick. The Warriors began the game's opening drive at their own 20-yard line after the opening kickoff was fielded in the end zone for a touchback. On the team's first two plays, Timmy Chang threw an incompletion and a short pass to running back West Keliikipi. On a short third down, a rush by Chang was stopped one yard shy of a first down, forcing Hawaii to punt.

UAB started the scoring with a 51-yard touchdown strike from quarterback Darrell Hackney to wide receiver Roddy White. The extra point attempt was blocked, and UAB opened up a 6–0 lead. Hawaii came right back with a 74-yard touchdown pass from Timmy Chang to Jason Rivers to take a 7–6 lead. UAB's Dan Burks scored on a 4-yard touchdown run to make the score 13–7 UAB. However, the Warriors responded with a pair of touchdowns to take a 21–13 lead at the end of the first quarter. West Keliikipi scored first on a 4-yard run, and Chang threw a 29-yard pass to Gerald Welch for the second score.

Second quarter
In the second quarter, Nick Hayes opened the scoring with a 22-yard field goal to bring UAB within 21–16. Hawaii answered with a 13-yard touchdown pass from Chang to Chad Owens bringing the lead to 28–16. Norris Drinkard scored on a 10-yard touchdown run for UAB to cut the lead to 28–23. Hayes second field goal of the quarter from 36-yards out with three seconds remaining in the half trimmed the lead to 28–26.

Third quarter
Hawaii blew the game wide open in the third quarter. First, Chad Owens caught a 15-yard touchdown pass from Timmy Chang, and then he scored on a 59-yard punt return. A Justin Ayat 43-yard field goal pushed the lead to 45–26. UAB's Hackney scored on a 4-yard touchdown run to bring the score to 45–33, but the Warriors would not fold.

Fourth quarter
In the fourth quarter, Timmy Chang drove Hawaii the length of the field, and capped a time consuming drive with a 4-yard touchdown run. Lance Rhodes caught a 17-yard touchdown pass from Hackney, to bring the score to 52–40. But the ensuing onside kick was returned by Hawaii's Britton Komine 42-yards for a Hawaii touchdown. That provided the final score, 59–40.

Scoring summary

References

Footnotes

Bibliography

Hawaii Bowl
Hawaii Bowl
Hawaii Rainbow Warriors football bowl games
UAB Blazers football bowl games
December 2004 sports events in the United States
2004 in sports in Hawaii